Simon Arizpe is an illustrator and paper engineer.

Life 
Simon Arizpe is a graduate of the Pratt Institute and resides in Brooklyn, New York.

Career 
Simon Arizpe served as the senior paper engineer and illustrator for the studios of Robert Sabuda and Matthew Reinhart for a decade.  He has worked on over 40 pop-up books. Simon is a visiting instructor at the Pratt Institute and teaches at Parsons School of Design in New York City. He is the recipient of the 2018 Meggendorfer Prize. His pop up book "The Wild" has been made part of the collection of the Cooper Hewitt, Smithsonian Design Museum library.

Awards and honors 
 Meggendorfer Prize for Best Paper Engineer for "Zahhak:The Legend of the Serpent King"
 Award of Excellence, Society of Illustrators, New York, NY, 2013
 Award of Excellence, Museum of Comic and Cartoon Art, New York, NY, 2013

References 

American illustrators
Living people
Year of birth missing (living people)
Pratt Institute alumni